There are various patterns of technological alliances from R&D enterprises to associations formed with the main purpose of sub-contracted manufacture or supply-chain management. The purpose here is to consider those forms of association devoted to the core of technology and to expand upon concepts touched upon in royalties.

While the three principal forms of association are (a)franchising (b) joint-ventures and (c)  strategic partnerships, there are a variety of formal forms of association pertaining to the technological core. They are, in no intentional order:

cross-licensing deals
modern equivalents of keiretsu, zaibatsu and chaebol arrangements
turnkey contracts
engineering contracts 
technical assistance contracts
technical  service contracts   
management contracts
contract of sale  
Venture Capital Agreements
Build-Operate-Transfer contracts
parent-subsidiary Agreements
Business Process Outsourcing (BPO)
conglomerates; inter alia agreements
Private equityFirm Agreements and Partnerships

References

Patent law